The Miss Montana's Outstanding Teen competition is the pageant that selects the representative for the U.S. state of Montana in the Miss America's Outstanding Teen pageant. The pageant is held in Glendive, Montana.

Bronté Bennion of Sidney was crowned Miss Montana's Outstanding Teen on July 3, 2022 at the Dawson County High School Auditorium in Glendive, Montana. She competed for the title of Miss America's Outstanding Teen 2023 at the Hyatt Regency Dallas in Dallas, Texas on August 12, 2022 where she was a Teens in Action finalist.

Results summary
The results of Miss Montana's Outstanding Teen as they participated in the national Miss America's Outstanding Teen competition. The year in parentheses indicates the year of the Miss America's Outstanding Teen competition the award/placement was garnered.

Placements
 Top 15: Amy Fox (2011)

Awards

Other awards 

 Teens in Action Finalist: Annika Bennion (2022), Bronté Bennion (2023)
Top Advertisement Sales: Annika Bennion (2022) (tie)

Winners

Notes

References

External links
 Official website

Events in Montana
Montana
Montana culture
Women in Montana
Beauty pageants
Annual events in the United States